César López (born 1973) is a Colombian musician.

César López may also refer to:

César López (author), Cuban writer winner of the Cuban National Prize for Literature
César López (Mexican musician) (born 1968), Mexican rock guitarist
César López Fretes (1923–2001), football striker from Paraguay
César López Paz (1984-), Global Advisor